Mute Wife is a 1990 Taiwanese television drama series based on Chiung Yao's 1965 novelette of the same name. The drama stars Leanne Liu in the titular role.

This is the second Taiwanese television series filmed completely in mainland China, after Wan-chun which is also based on a 1965 Chiung Yao novelette. The Mute Wife was broadcast on Chinese Television System right after Wan-chun, from March 15 to April 10. Both series are set in Republican era Beijing, and were filmed in both Beijing and Changsha.

Cast
Leanne Liu as Fang Yiyi
Lin Jui-yang as Liu Jingyan
Chao Yung-hsin as Mo Yanhua
Jin Chao-chun as Liu Yiyun
Juan Ju-chih as Yu Zhongfang
Chen Chi as Dong Yihong
Wang Yu-ling as Jiang Qiaojuan
Yen Chen-yao as Liu Jingting
Fan Hung-hsuan as Fang Shixuan
Lee Li-feng as Shen Shuzhen

Awards
1991 Golden Bell Awards
Won—Best TV Series
Nominated—Best Actress (Leanne Liu)

References

External links

1990 Taiwanese television series debuts
1990 Taiwanese television series endings
Chinese Television System original programming
Mandarin-language television shows
Television shows based on works by Chiung Yao
Television shows filmed in Hunan
Television shows filmed in Beijing
Television shows set in Beijing